Mandeville is an unincorporated community in Carroll County, in the U.S. state of Missouri.

History
A post office called Mandeville was established in 1854, and remained in operation until 1903. The community derives its name from Amanda Shirley, the love interest of an early settler.

References

Unincorporated communities in Carroll County, Missouri
Unincorporated communities in Missouri